Elections to Southampton City Council took place on Thursday 3 May 2018, alongside nationwide local elections, alongside other local elections across the country. The elections saw no changes in the overall composition of the council, however saw seats being exchanged. The Labour Party lost Bitterne, Millbrook and Peartree to the Conservative party while the Conservatives lost Freemantle, Portswood and Swaythling to Labour. This led to the Labour leader of the council, Simon Letts, and the leader of the Conservative group in the city, Jeremy Moulton, losing their seats.

Background and Campaigning
In the lead up to the election, the BBC had summarised that the situation in Southampton for the Labour Party was incredibly precarious and one seat loss could deprive the party of a majority. They cited the Redbridge ward as a target for the main opposition the Conservatives, yet the Conservatives came third to the Southampton Independents candidate. Labour targeted the Conservative seats of Freemantle, Portswood and Swaythling, as well as the independent Coxford ward.

Labour made a commitment to building 1,000 homes in the city over five years, invest further in council services, build a modular home factory and create a Clean Air Zone for the city. The Conservative Party offered a series of policies to tackle air pollution and traffic in the city: suggesting two new railway stations in the city, one at St Mary's Stadium and one in Ocean Village potentially where the old Southampton Terminus Station was, allow free parking for electric vehicles and introducing more electric charge points in the city. The Liberal Democrats focused on the quality of roads within the city and was sceptical of the way resources were used by the Labour administration to tackle homelessness in the city.

The council had come under scrutiny for its decision to close the Kentish Road respite centre, which was due to budget cuts. Activists Lisa Stead and Amanda Guest, who have campaigned on the issue, stood in Bitterne and Shirely, respectively, with the 'Putting People First' group on the council. The Conservatives committed to fully reopening the respite centre.

Election results

Overall election result
As the council is elected in thirds, one councillor for each of the 16 wards are elected each year. All comparisons in seats and swing are to the corresponding Southampton Council election, 2014.

Changes in council composition

Ward results

References 

2018 English local elections
2018
2010s in Southampton